Meridian (Russian: Меридиан) is a family of telecommunications satellites for civil and military use developed by Russia in the 2000s placed in a Molniya Orbit and intended to replace the two last series of Molniya satellites still in activity, as well as the old Parus satellites. The first launch took place on 24 December 2006, aboard a Soyuz 2.1a. Seven satellites were launched between 2006 and 2014, six of which reached orbit. A second generation of satellite, Meridian-M was ordered, and the first unit was launched on 30 July 2019.

Technical characteristics 

This family of satellites was developed in the mid-2000s by the main Russian satellite manufacturer ISS Reshetnev who had already built the Molniya satellites. According to unofficial sources, the satellite uses 3 axes stabilized pressurized platform. Certain components like the on-board computer and the propulsion would be common with the Uragan-M satellites of the Glonass satellite navigation system. The manufacturer indicated that the satellites of the series have a mass of approximately 2000 kg, have orientable solar arrays and carry three transponders designed to work with the Raduga satellites. The lifespan announced by the manufacturer was 7 years.

Orbit and use 

Like its predecessors, the Meridian satellites are placed in a very elliptical Molniya orbit of 900 × 39000 km x 63° which allows them to remain during a large part of their orbit visible from Arctic areas poorly served by geostationary telecommunications orbits. The launcher used is a Soyuz 2.1a with a Fregat upper stage which is launched from the Plesetsk cosmodrome. The satellite is for mixed civil and military use. Given their orbit, they are mainly intended to provide links with ships and planes operating in the Arctic Ocean, as well as with stations based in the Far East and Siberia.

List of satellites launched
The first satellite in the series quickly fell victim to space debris according to the Russian authorities.

The numbering of the satellites is quite specific. The manufacturer ISS Rechetnev begins numbering its satellites at 11, the first numbers being reserved for test specimens. The letter L is attached to the number to indicate that it is a flying copy (лётный in Russian). Thus, the first satellite is called Meridian n°11L. Other sources such as the NASA Space Science Data Coordinated Archive list them as simply Meridian 1, Meridian 2, etc.

Last update: 22 March 2021

References

Telecommunications companies of Russia
Communications satellites of Russia